Chandni Football Club is an Indian football club based in  Calicut, Kerala. The club has formerly played in the I-League 2nd Division alongside the Kerala Premier League.

History
Founded in 2000 in Calicut, Chandni FC participated in I-League 2nd Division in 2009 but could not progress further than group stages.

Stadium

Calicut Chandni FC plays all its home matches at the EMS Stadium, which is located in the heart of Calicut city. West stand is the largest block and can accommodate most spectators. Currently the capacity of the stadium is limited close to 80,000.

Supporters
During its time as Calicut Chandni FC, a fan club named Calicut Blue Blood were the supporters since 2010. The EMS Stadium had seen an average attendance of 80,000. The players and the coach had often acknowledged the fans' support in the success and called them "The 12th Man".

Kit manufacturers and shirt sponsors

Players

Current squad

Records

Key
Tms. = Number of teams
Pos. = Position in league
Attendance/G = Average league attendance

Managerial record

References

Football clubs in Kerala
Association football clubs established in 2000
2000 establishments in Kerala
I-League 2nd Division clubs